Phénicia Dupras (born 8 August 1996) is a French female canoeist who won five medals at senior level at the Wildwater Canoeing World Championships.

Medals at the World Championships
Senior

References

External links
 

1996 births
Living people
French female canoeists
Place of birth missing (living people)